Corruption is a 1933 American Pre-Code film directed by Charles E. Roberts and starring Evalyn Knapp and Preston Foster. The film is also known as Double Exposure in the United Kingdom.

Plot summary
Tim Butler (Preston Foster) is elected Mayor of a city known for corruption, unfortunately, he is elected by those who are corrupt.  Butler is set up and removed from office, to only be convicted of killing Regan (Warner Richmond), a major member of the political machine.  Butler is helped by his loyal assistant, Ellen (Evalyn Knapp) and is eventually exonerated.

Cast
Evalyn Knapp as Ellen Manning
Preston Foster as Tim Butler
Charles Delaney as Charlie Jasper
Tully Marshall as Gorman
Warner Richmond as Regan
Huntley Gordon as District Attorney Blake
Lane Chandler as Assistant District Attorney King
Natalie Moorhead as Sylvia Gorman
Mischa Auer as Volkov
Jason Robards, Sr. as Police Commissioner
Gwen Lee as Mae
Sidney Bracey as Dr. Robbins

External links

1933 films
1933 crime films
1930s English-language films
American black-and-white films
American crime films
1930s American films